Anthropogenic ("human" + "generating") is an adjective that may refer to:

 Anthropogeny, the study of the origins of humanity

Counterintuitively, anthropogenic may also refer to things that have been generated by humans, as follows:

 Human impact on the environment, i.e. anthropogenic impact on the environment
 Anthropogenic biome
 Anthropogenic climate change, human-caused global warming and its effects
 Anthropogenic cloud
 Anthropogenic greenhouse gases
 Anthropogenic hazard
 Anthropogenic metabolism